Morindeae is a tribe of flowering plants in the family Rubiaceae. The tribe contains about 165 species in 5 genera, found mainly in the tropics and subtropics.

Genera 
Currently accepted names

 Appunia Hook.f. (14 sp)
 Coelospermum Blume (11 sp)
 Gynochthodes Blume (97 sp)
 Morinda L. (42 sp)
 Siphonandrium K.Schum. (1 sp)

Synonyms

 Appunettia R.D.Good = Morinda
 Belicea Lundell = Morinda
 Bellynkxia Müll.Arg. = Appunia
 Figuierea Montrouz. = Coelospermum
 Guttenbergia Zoll. & Moritzi = Gynochthodes
 Holostyla Endl. = Coelospermum
 Holostylis Rchb. = Coelospermum
 Imantina Hook.f. = Gynochthodes
 Merismostigma S.Moore = Coelospermum
 Olostyla DC. = Coelospermum
 Pogonanthus Montrouz. = Gynochthodes
 Pogonolobus F.Muell. = Coelospermum
 Rojoc Adans. = Morinda
 Sarcopygme Setch. & Christoph. = Morinda
 Sphaerophora Blume = Gynochthodes
 Stigmanthus Lour. = Gynochthodes
 Tetralopha Hook.f. = Gynochthodes
 Trisciadia Hook.f. = Coelospermum

References 

 
Rubioideae tribes
Taxa named by Friedrich Anton Wilhelm Miquel